The Politzariellinae are a subfamily of the family Cossidae (carpenter or goat moths).

Genera
 Holcoceroides Strand, [1913]
 Politzariella Yakovlev, 2011
 Geraldocossus Yakovlev & Sáfián, 2016

References

External links
Natural History Museum Lepidoptera generic names catalog

 
Cossidae
Moth subfamilies